Qozhaya, also transliterated Qazahya is located in the Zgharta District in the North Governorate of Lebanon. It belongs to the Lebanese Maronite Order known as Baladites.

Monastery of Saint Anthony of Qozhaya
It is dedicated to Saint Anthony the Great. It is commonly called Qozhaya, in reference to the valley in which it is located. The valley of Qozhaya, along with the valley of Qannoubine (Arabic: قنوبين) to which it is connected to the west, form what is called the valley of Qadisha .

Etymology
The etymology of the name Qozhaya varies according to the opinions of scholars. However, in recent years the Syriac origin was most commonly adopted, and approximately translates to the treasure of life.

History

Qozhaya is considered to be one of the oldest monasteries of the valley of Qadisha. It was founded during the roman empire last centuries in Roman Phoenicia.

Several hermitages are attached to it; and at a certain period (probably the 12th Century AD) it has been the See of the Maronite Patriarch. 

In 1584, the first non-Jewish printing press of the Middle East, and third overall, was installed in this monastery.

In 1610, The press printed a bilingual Psalter in a small folio of 260 pages. The psalms are arranged in two columns, on the right is the text in Syriac and on the left in Arabic, but written in Syriac letters, which is known as Garshuni.

In 1708, it was handed down to the newly formed Lebanese Maronite Order. It still belongs to this important Order. Qozhaya was at its pinnacle in the first part of the 19th Century with more than 300 monks belonging to it.

With its large properties in the valley, in Ain-Baqra and in Jedaydeh, Qozhaya is one of the richest monasteries of the Order. It contributes financially to the maintenance of the less fortunate monasteries of the Order.

What to see
 The Grotto of Saint Anthony the Great
 The Church
 The Museum
 The Library
 The Hermitage of Mar Boula

References

External links
 The official site of the Monastery of Qozhaya
 Ehden Family Tree

Maronite monasteries in Lebanon
Populated places in the North Governorate
Zgharta District
4th-century establishments in the Byzantine Empire